The 1985 International cricket season was from May 1985 to September 1985.

Season overview

May

Australia in England

August

India in Sri Lanka

References

1985 in cricket